The 1990–1992 movement in Madagascar (Malagasy: Fihetsiketsehana 1990-1992 teto Madagascar) was a strike movement and popular uprising that rocked Madagascar demanding free results of elections, new constitution and shared their dissatisfaction with the government in Madagascar which led to elections and the fall of the government in 1990–1992.

Background
Madagascar gained its independence from French colonialism in 1960 after nearly 70 years under French rule. Vice Admiral Didier Ratsiraka was sworn into office on December 21, 1975, after a military coup ousted president Philibert Tsiranana, who had been in office since 1959. In his first term as president, Ratsiraka nationalized Madagascar’s banks, insurance companies and mineral resources, following a socialist model that was wrought with censorship and government repression. By the late 1980's Ratsiraka’s socialist regime had impoverished Madagascar. Even though the regime had made concessions to adopt the free market reforms outlined by the IMF, poverty and repression drew fast growing voices of opposition.

Protests
Widespread unrest and social strikes erupted led by civil servants and opposition activists in the capital, Antananarivo and spread to other cities in the nation. Protesters rallied for justice and support of the opposition, demanding new elections and fresh votes. Opposition-led anti-government protests occurred throughout the nation as president Didier Ratsiraka deployed troops. The protests was organised first in 1990 by trade and labour unions.

Marches, nonviolent strikes, general strikes, occupations, boycotts, protest rallies and public speeches, meetings and demonstrations occurred throughout the capital and major cities in the country. Protesters were inspired by the changes of regime and the Revolutions of 1989 occurring in the world. Police had to confront protesters, soon leading to violence and battles. Politicians also demanded president Didier to step down.

Anti-government protests intensified and turned into an intensive movement and opposition uprising, with grassroots opposition demonstrations and protest rallies and strike actions daily throughout the spring-summer of 1991. A wave of protests hit the country and countrywide protests erupted in August. On August 10, killings occurred during protests, leading to the deaths of 10+ demonstrators. The military also led mass strikes in support of protesters.

10,000 – 400,000 protesters continued protests and rallies amid growing disturbances and massive discontent rising and tensions among police and demonstrators. Millions of protesters protested over the next few weeks, demonstrating for their rights, free votes and demanded the fall of the regime. Albert Zafy led mass demonstrations throughout the country for the next few months. Working-class protesters did walkouts in protest at the government.

After Albert led protests (Zaby is an opposition figure), the government crackdowns escalated, arrests became frequent and rioting erupted. Indignant protests and furious crowds, led by workers and sector worker groups, occurred amid growing street protests and riots. The government of Ratsiraka decided to concede the demands of demonstrators and hooded 2 referendums and new elections due to popular pressure and street anger.

See also
 2002 Malagasy political crisis

References

1990 protests
1991 protests
1992 protests
Revolutions of 1989